Cove Lake is an alpine lake in Custer County, Idaho, United States, located in the White Cloud Mountains in the Sawtooth National Recreation Area.  The lake is accessed from Sawtooth National Forest trail 601.

Cove Lake is east of D. O. Lee Peak and next to Hook Lake.  It is also upstream of Walker Lake and downstream of Snow, Boulder, Gentian, Sapphire, and Cirque Lakes as well as The Kettles.

References

See also
 List of lakes of the White Cloud Mountains
 Sawtooth National Recreation Area
 White Cloud Mountains

Lakes of Idaho
Lakes of Custer County, Idaho
Glacial lakes of the United States
Glacial lakes of the Sawtooth National Forest